Rachele Gilmore is an American coloratura soprano, originally from Atlanta, Georgia.

She earned her bachelor degree from Indiana University and continued with graduate studies at Boston University. After her unscheduled major debut, she was compared to Mado Robin.

Career 
She made her debut performing in the Metropolitan Opera on 23 December 2009 as cover for Kathleen Kim in the role of Olympia in the opera The Tales of Hoffmann. She had less than four hours' notice that she would sing that night, and the curtain was even briefly held past 20:00 to allow her to walk the stage. She interpolated a high A-flat (A♭6) into Olympia's aria, which, at the time, was conjectured to be the highest note to have ever been sung on the stage of the Met.

Notes

External links 

Living people
Musicians from Atlanta
Singers from Georgia (U.S. state)
American operatic sopranos
Operalia, The World Opera Competition prize-winners
Indiana University alumni
Boston University alumni
Year of birth missing (living people)
Classical musicians from Georgia (U.S. state)
21st-century American women opera singers